The Puzzler may refer to:

Puzzler (DC Comics), a DC Comics character
Puzzler (Gobots), a fictional combiner made of 6 Renegade Gobots who turn into cars
Puzzler (Numberjacks), a villain on the BBC television series Numberjacks
Someone who composes and/or solves puzzles
A contest on the American radio series Car Talk